Dame Mary Elaine Kellett-Bowman, DBE (née Kay; 8 July 1923 – 4 March 2014) was a British Conservative Party politician, serving as Member of Parliament (MP) for the constituency of Lancaster for 27 years from 1970 to 1997.

Life and career
Born Mary Elaine Kay to Walter and Edith (née Leather) Kay, she was educated at The Mount School, York, St Anne's College, Oxford, and Barnett House, Oxford, and became a barrister, called to the bar by Middle Temple in 1964. She served as a councillor on Denbigh Borough Council, 1952–55, and the London Borough of Camden, 1968–74. She was also a governor of Culford School in Suffolk from 1963 to 2003.

As Mary Kellett, she contested Nelson and Colne in 1955, South West Norfolk twice in 1959 (including a by-election), and Buckingham in 1964 and 1966. She was MP for Lancaster from 1970 until her retirement in 1997. She also served as a Member of the European Parliament in the British delegation from 1975, and was then elected for Cumbria in 1979. She remained an MEP until 1984, when she stepped down in order to concentrate on her seat in the British Parliament.

Capital Gay arson attack
In 1987, the London paper Capital Gays offices were targeted in an arson attack. Tony Banks MP said in the House of Commons, "On a point of order, Mr Speaker. I heard the honorable Member for Lancaster [Kellett-Bowman] say that it was quite right that Capital Gay should have been fire—", at which point he was interrupted by a point of order. Kellett-Bowman responded, "I am quite prepared to affirm that it is quite right that there should be an intolerance of evil."

Personal life
She had four children with her first husband, Charles Norman Kellett, but was widowed in December 1959; her husband died in a car accident in which she suffered head injuries and memory loss.

She married Edward Bowman in June 1971; the couple served alongside each other on Camden Borough Council (as Aldermen) and as Members of the European Parliament; both took the shared surname of 'Kellett-Bowman'.

References

Sources
Times Guide to the House of Commons, Times Newspapers Ltd, 1955, 1966, 1992 and 1997 editions. 
Who's Who, 2007 edition 
 Wikipedia article Capital Gay

External links
 

1923 births
2014 deaths
Alumni of St Anne's College, Oxford
Female members of the Parliament of the United Kingdom for English constituencies
Conservative Party (UK) MPs for English constituencies
Councillors in Wales
Councillors in the London Borough of Camden
Dames Commander of the Order of the British Empire
UK MPs 1970–1974
UK MPs 1974
UK MPs 1974–1979
UK MPs 1979–1983
UK MPs 1983–1987
UK MPs 1987–1992
UK MPs 1992–1997
20th-century women MEPs for England
Conservative Party (UK) MEPs
MEPs for the United Kingdom 1973–1979
MEPs for England 1979–1984
Members of the Parliament of the United Kingdom for constituencies in Lancashire
People educated at The Mount School, York
Place of birth missing
Place of death missing
Women councillors in Wales